Margaret of Austria (c. 1416 – 12 February 1486), a member of the House of Habsburg, was Electress of Saxony from 1431 until 1464 by her marriage with the Wettin elector Frederick II. She was a sister of Emperor Frederick III.

Life
Born in Innsbruck, Margaret was the eldest daughter of the Inner Austrian duke Ernest the Iron (1377–1424) and his second wife, the Piast princess Cymburgis of Masovia (1394/97–1429). Upon her father's death, she and her siblings were raised under the tutelage of their uncle Duke Frederick IV of Austria.

At Wiener Neustadt, young Margaret was betrothed to Elector Frederick II, heir of both the Saxe-Wittenberg electorate and the Margravate of Meissen, not long after his accession in 1428; the wedding took place on 3 June 1431 in Leipzig. The conjugal bond with the Habsburgs strengthened her husband's position, particularly when Margaret's brother Duke Frederick V of Austria was elected King of the Romans in 1440 (as Frederick III). The electoral couple accompanied the new king to his coronation at Aachen Cathedral two years later. Margaret evolved plans to marry her first-born son Frederick to Elizabeth of Austria, daughter of her cousin King Albert II of Germany, however, the twelve-year-old boy died in 1451.

Margaret went on to reside at the Meissen court, where she had a significant impact on her husband's government: in 1432 she had all Jews expelled from the former margravate. In the Saxon Fratricidal War over the 1445 Division of Altenburg, she helped to reconcile her husband with his rebellious brother, Landgrave William III of Thuringia. Margaret received her own coinage (Margarethengroschen) and a mint in the Saxon burgraviate of Colditz, which caused further trouble with her brother-in-law William. Nevertheless, the minting privilege was finally confirmed by Emperor Frederick III in a 1463 deed.

Margaret was regarded as a Christian-influenced woman. After the Saxon Fratricidal War, she set up a spiritual foundation and in 1453 laid the foundation for the Fourteen Holy Helpers (Vierzehnheiligen) sanctuary in a devastated village near Jena. The consecration of the pilgrimage church in 1464 marked the beginning of the resettlement.

In the night of 7/8 July 1455, her two minor sons Ernest and Albert were abducted from the castle of Altenburg by henchmen of the Saxon noble Kunz von Kaufungen, a former knight in the service of Elector Frederick II, who aimed to extort compensation for the losses that he suffered in the Fratricidal War. He nevertheless was pursued and captured in short time on his way to the Bohemian border, and the princes were saved. 

After the death of her husband on 7 September 1464, Margaret received an extensive dowry, including the castle and city of Altenburg as well as nearby Leipzig, Liebenwerda, Colditz, Eilenburg and Liebenwerda. Until her death she lived at Altenburg Castle, where she exercised her sovereign rights and thus was under the jurisdiction. In the Old Castle in 1468, she set up a grain house, which was destroyed by fire in 1868. With the support of the Altenburg civil servants who cared for her household plot, Margaret gave generous supplies industries. 

In 1485, she had to witness the division of the Saxon territories between her sons according to the Treaty of Leipzig. Margaret died the next year in Altenburg and was buried in the Castle's local church. She was outlived by six of her eight children.

Family 
Margaret and Frederick had eight children:
 Amalia (b. Meissen, 4 April 1436 – d. Rochlitz, 19 October 1501), married on 21 March 1452 to Louis IX, Duke of Bavaria
 Anna (b. Meissen, 7 March 1437 – d. Neustadt am Aisch, 31 October 1512), married on 12 November 1458 to Albert III Achilles, Elector of Brandenburg
 Frederick (b. Meissen, 28 August 1439 – d. Meissen, 23 December 1451)
 Ernest, Elector of Saxony (b. Meissen, 24 March 1441 – d. Colditz, 26 August 1486)
 Albert, Duke of Saxony (b. Grimma, 31 July 1443 – d. Emden, 12 September 1500)
 Margaret (b. Meissen?, 1444 – d. Seusslitz?, ca. 19 November 1498), Abbess of Seusslitz
 Hedwig (b. Meissen?, 31 October 1445 – d. Quedlinburg, 13 June 1511), Abbess of Quedlinburg (1458)
 Alexander (b. Meissen, 24 June 1447 – d. Meissen, 14 September 1447).

Ancestors

References

|-

|-

1416 births
1486 deaths
15th-century House of Habsburg
Electresses of Saxony
Duchesses of Saxony
15th-century German women
15th-century German people
People from Innsbruck
Daughters of monarchs